John Phillip Santos (born 1957) is an American freelance filmmaker, producer, journalist, and author. In 1979, he became the first Mexican-American Rhodes Scholar.

Early life
Santos was born and raised in San Antonio, Texas. In 1997, Santos joined the Ford Foundation as an officer in the Media, Arts and Culture Program.

He lived in New York City for twenty years, returning to San Antonio in May 2005.

Career
His articles have appeared in the Los Angeles Times, San Antonio Express-News, and the New York Times. As an executive producer, he has over forty broadcast documentaries on culture, religion, politics and spirituality for CBS News and PBS, some of which have been nominated for Emmys. As a director he has been involved in program development for Thirteen/WNET in New York City.

Santos was an Emmy nominee in 1988 for From the AIDS Experience: Part I, Our Spirits to Heal/ Part II, Our Humanity to Heal, and in 1985 for Exiles Who Never Leave Home. He has an MA English Literature and Language from St. Catherine's College at Oxford University and a BA in Philosophy and Literature from the University of Notre Dame.

Between August 7 and August 18, 2006, Texas Public Radio (KSTX 89.1 FM) broadcast Santos reading from his family memoir Places Left Unfinished at the Time of Creation.

Awards
He has been awarded the Academy of American Poets' Prize at Notre Dame, the Oxford Prize for fiction, and the Berlin Prize Fellow at the American Academy in Berlin. His family memoir, Places Left Unfinished at the Time of Creation was a finalist for the National Book Award. He was also a past member of the President's Advisory Commission on Educational Excellence for Hispanic Americans.

Bibliography
 The Farthest Home is in an Empire of Fire
 Places Left Unfinished at the Time of Creation
 Songs Older Than Any Known Singer: Selected and New Poems, 1974–2006, with Arturo Madrid

Further reading
Art at Our Doorstep: San Antonio Writers and Artists featuring John Phillips Santos. Edited by Nan Cuba and Riley Robinson (Trinity University Press, 2008).

Notes

References
 
 
 John Phillip Santos Papers at the University of Texas at San Antonio Archives and Special Collections:

External links
 Inventory of the John Phillip Santos Papers, University of Texas at San Antonio Libraries (UTSA Libraries) Special Collections.

1957 births
Living people
American people of Mexican descent